Lake Point Tower is a residential skyscraper located on a promontory of the Lake Michigan waterfront in Chicago, just north of the Chicago River at 505 North Lake Shore Drive.  Completed in 1968, it is in the Streeterville neighborhood on the Near North Side. Located adjacent to Navy Pier, the building is the only skyscraper in the city east of Lake Shore Drive.

Its tall curved three wing 'Y' shape was an inspiration for the Burj Khalifa tower in Dubai, United Arab Emirates by Chicago-born architect Adrian Smith.

Development

The architects for Lake Point Tower were John Heinrich and George Schipporeit, working under the firm name of Schipporeit and Heinrich; the two were students of Ludwig Mies van der Rohe, one of the best known architects of the Bauhaus movement and International Style school, who taught at the Illinois Institute of Technology in Chicago. The project developer was William F. Hartnett, Jr., chairman and founder of Hartnett-Shaw Development Company, which was responsible for more than 260 residential and commercial real estate developments in the United States from 1961–1983.

Because of its height and lakeside site, the skyscraper had to be designed to withstand high winds.  At the center of the building is a triangular core, 59 feet wide, that contains nine elevators and three stairwells.  This core holds all of the vertical weight of the building, allowing the perimeter columns on the facade to be much smaller.

Radiating from the core are three arms that form an asymmetrical Y-shaped floor plan. The original four-armed design was changed to a three-armed design (120° apart). The outer walls are curved to prevent residents from seeing into other condominiums.  The façade of the building is a curtain of bronze-tinted glass framed by gold-anodized aluminum, which reflects the sunlight off of Lake Michigan and looks golden.

Other features

Well known for its graceful curves and picturesque location, Lake Point Tower is the only major private structure on the east side of Lake Shore Drive. Its position between Lake Shore Drive and Navy Pier gives it unobstructed views in all directions that are protected by ordinances limiting construction on the city's waterfront.

At the top of the building on its 70th floor, is the upscale restaurant Cité.

Lake Point Tower was one of the first high-rise residential buildings in the world to feature all-electric appliances. It pioneered the concept of the "Park in the City," as the first residential complex in a major city to have its own two-and-one-half acre park—including a playground, pool, duck pond, and waterfalls — three stories above ground. There are shops and restaurants on the first two levels of the complex, under the park.

Film and television shot on location
Lake Point Tower has been host to many shoots including:
 Raw Deal (1986)
 Folks! (1991)
 Straight Talk (1992) This film featured Dolly Parton and James Woods, and had Parton's character living in Lake Point Tower.
 While You Were Sleeping (1995) Parts of this film, starring Sandra Bullock and Peter Gallagher, were shot in Lake Point Tower.
 Meet the Parents (2000)
 Category 6: Day of Destruction (2004) In an outtake of this film, it is destroyed by a tornado in news footage.
 The Lake House (2006) Hospital reception area filmed in Lake Point Tower's lobby.
 Divergent (2014) Briefly shown abandoned and decayed in a future Chicago. Huge Lake Michigan is shown to have transformed into a wetland in the same shot.
 Station Eleven (2021) Frank's (Jeevan's brother) condominium.

Notable residents

 David Axelrod, Political Consultant
 Ryne Sandberg, former Chicago Cubs 2nd baseman
 Sammy Sosa, former Chicago Cubs right fielder
 Alice Cooper, rock singer, songwriter and musician
 Ozzie Guillén, former Chicago White Sox shortstop and manager
 Andre Dawson, former Chicago Cubs outfielder
 Scottie Pippen, former Chicago Bulls player
 Goldie Hawn, actress
 Kurt Russell, actor
 Rich (Goose) Gossage, former Chicago White Sox pitcher
 Mickey Rooney, film and stage actor
 Joakim Noah, former Chicago Bulls center
 B. J. Armstrong, former Chicago Bulls player
 Helen Reddy, singer of "I am Woman; Hear Me Roar"
 Vince Evans, former Chicago Bears quarterback

Position in Chicago's skyline

See also 

 Chicago architecture
 List of buildings
 List of skyscrapers
 List of tallest buildings in Chicago
 List of tallest buildings in the United States
 World's tallest structures
 Harbor Point (skyscraper)
 Park Tower Condominium (Chicago)

References

Further reading

Skyscrapers, Antonino Terranova, White Star Publishers, 2003
 In 2007, the American Institute of Architects  listed Lake Point Tower as one of America's 150 favorite structures.

External links
 

Residential buildings completed in 1968
Residential condominiums in Chicago
Residential skyscrapers in Chicago
1968 establishments in Illinois
Streeterville, Chicago